HCM Slobozia is a women's handball club from Slobozia, Romania, that plays in the Liga Națională.

Kits

Honours
Divizia A 
Runners-up (1): 2018–19

2020-2021 Team

Current squad  

Goalkeepers

Wingers

 25  Gabriela Moldoveanu
 97  Catalina Sava
Line players

Back players

2019–20 HCM Slobozia season

Players

Players In
  Florenta Ilie (RW)
  Gabriela Moldoveanu (RW)
  Ana Ciolan (PV)
  Alexandra Banciu (CB)
  Ștefania Bălăceanu (LB)

Players Out

External links 
  
  

Romanian handball clubs
Liga Națională (women's handball) clubs
Handball clubs established in 2008
2008 establishments in Romania
Slobozia